The Robbery (Turkish: Soygun) is a 1953 Turkish adventure film directed by Sami Ayanoglu.

Cast
 Sami Ayanoglu
 Heyecan Basaran 
 Sadri Alisik 
 Suavi Tedü 
 Talat Artemel
 Peruz Agopyan 
 Sakir Arseven 
 Atif Avci 
 Berrin Aydan 
 Necdet Mahfi Ayral 
 Viktor Açikyan
 Aziz Basmaci 
 Ugur Boran
 Hasan Ceylan 
 Kemal Ergüvenç 
 Vehdi Ersin 
 Mehmet Karaca 
 Müfit Kiper 
 Nergiz Mogol 
 Saziye Moral 
 Hasan Mutlucan 
 Saadet Nazikcan 
 Kadir Savun 
 Nubar Terziyan

References

Bibliography
 Burçak Evren. Türk sinema sanatçıları ansiklopedisi. Film-San Vakfı Yayınları, 1983.

External links
 

1953 films
1953 adventure films
1950s Turkish-language films
Turkish adventure films
Turkish black-and-white films